The Malawi gar (Lichnochromis acuticeps)  is a species of predatory cichlid endemic to Lake Malawi.  This species can reach a length of  TL.  It can also be found in the aquarium trade.  It is the only known species in its genus.

References

Malawi gar
Fish of Lake Malawi
Monotypic fish genera
Malawi gar
Taxonomy articles created by Polbot